Melba Roy Mouton (1929–1990) was an American mathematician who served as Assistant Chief of Research Programs at NASA's Trajectory and Geodynamics Division in the 1960s and headed a group of NASA mathematicians called "computers". She served as Head Mathematician for Echo Satellites 1 and 2 before becoming Head Computer Programmer and then Program Production Section Chief at Goddard Space Flight Center.

Early life and education 
Mouton was born in 1929, in Fairfax, Virginia to Rhodie and Edna Chloe. She graduated from Howard University in 1950 with a master's degree in mathematics, after receiving a bachelor's degree in mathematics with a minor in physics. While at Howard, Mouton was president of the Kelly Miller Chapter of Future Teachers of America and a member of the NAACP, the Mathematics Club, and the Delta Sigma Theta sorority. She also was on the Dean's Honor Roll for four years, and was selected for the 1949-1950 Who’s Who among Students in American Universities and Colleges.

Career 
She started working for NASA in 1959, after working for the Army Map Service and the Census Bureau. The following year, Echo 1 was put into orbit, and Mouton led a team of NASA mathematicians (known as "computers") in tracking its orbit. While at Godddard, Mouton was an instructor for a series of seminars on A Programming Language held at Watson Research Labs. In a NASA symposium, she published a paper about the importance of investing in thorough, descriptive program documentation for projects which are to be maintainable over time. She was also prominently featured alongside some of her African American colleagues in an advertisement in the Afro American designed to spotlight NASA's diversity. Mouton received both an Apollo Achievement Award and an Exceptional Performance Award from NASA before she retired in 1973.

Personal life 
Mouton had three children and was married twice, first to Wardell Roy and later to Webster Mouton. She died in Silver Spring, Maryland on June 25, 1990 of a brain tumor at the age of 61.

Commemoration 
In 2023, lunar mountain Mons Mouton was named in her honor.

References 

1920s births
1990 deaths
Deaths from brain tumor
Howard University alumni
NASA people
People from Fairfax, Virginia
20th-century American mathematicians
American women mathematicians
African-American mathematicians
20th-century women mathematicians
Mathematicians from Virginia
Computer scientists
American women computer scientists
American computer scientists
African-American computer scientists
20th-century African-American women
20th-century African-American people